Donna L. Cottrell is a retired United States Coast Guard rear admiral who last served as the Coast Guard District 9 Commander. In this role, she served as the senior Commander for the Great Lakes and Saint Lawrence Seaway, an area that covers eight states. The Area of Operations for the command accumulates over 6,700 miles of shoreline and 1,500 miles of international shoreline with Canada. In addition, she previously oversaw the service level command, Helicopter Interdiction Tactical Squadron (HITRON) out of Jacksonville, FL.

Education 
Cottrell grew up in Wellington, Ohio, she would go on to attending Ohio University graduating with a bachelor's degree in Education in 1982. Cottrell joined the Coast Guard in 1983 after working as a substitute teacher in Wellington for one year. Cottrell would receive her commission from Officer Candidate School in 1987. She completed naval flight training at Whiting Field in 1991. Cottrell would later receive her Master of Science degree in Aeronautical Science from Embry-Riddle Aeronautical University in 1997. In 2004, she would receive another Master of Science degree from Air Force Institute of Technology studying Information Resource Management. From the U.S. Naval War College in 2011 she obtained a Master of Arts degree in National Security and Strategic Studies.

Career 
Rear Admiral Cottrell previously served as the Director, Joint Interagency Task Force West (JIATF West), the U.S. Pacific Command’s executive agent for the Department of Defense counter-drug activities.

She also previously served as the Deputy to the Assistant Commandant for Capability. Responsible for identifying and sourcing new capabilities, abilities for the ever demanding, and adapting Coast Guard missions. She was a crucial role in the development of a service-wide policy for Coast Guard staffing, training, and equipping readiness.

From 2014 to 2016, Cottrell served as Coast Guard District 13 Chief of Staff. She directed Coast Guard field and staff activities in Washington, Oregon, Idaho, and Montana in support of the District Commander's strategy and outlook.

In 2011 she assumed command of Helicopter Interdiction Tactical Squadron (HITRON) a famed anti-smuggling unit of the Coast Guard that supports Deployable Operations Group which provides helicopters and expertly trained aircrews and precision marksmen to disable Go-fast drug boats.

Earlier in her career, Cottrell served as a TH-57 helicopter flight instructor attached to Navy Helicopter Training Squadron Eight out of Naval Air Station Whiting Field. She acquired over 3500 flight hours in four different models of the Eurocopter MH-65 Dolphin and HH-65 Dolphin helicopter.

Her other assignments include:

 Commanding Officer of Air Station Savannah
 Executive Officer at Air Station Detroit
 Air Operations Officer at Group-Air Station Atlantic City
 Administration Officer at Air Station Chicago
 Chief of the Information Systems Division at Aircraft Repair and Supply Center in Elizabeth City, NC.

Cottrell was relieved as Ninth District commander by Rear Admiral Michael J. Johnston, and retired the same day.

Awards 
Rear Admiral Cottrell's awards include two Legion of Merits, the Meritorious Service Medal, three Coast Guard Commendation Medals, and the Navy Achievement Medal.

   Defense Superior Service Medal
   Legion of Merit with one Gold Stars
   Meritorious Service Medal
   Coast Guard Commendation Medal with two Gold Stars

References

External links 

 USCG Biography of Donna Cottrell
 PACOM.mil web site
 Coast Guard Great Lakes to welcome new Rear Admiral Donna Cottrell - Cleveland News, April 2, 2019

1959 births
Living people
People from Cleveland
Ohio University alumni
United States Naval Aviators
Embry–Riddle Aeronautical University alumni
Air Force Institute of Technology alumni
Naval War College alumni
United States Coast Guard admirals
Female admirals of the United States Coast Guard
Recipients of the Legion of Merit
21st-century American women